Showdown at Area 51 is a 2007 Sci-Fi TV film directed by C. Roma and starring Jason London and Gigi Edgley. The screenplay concerns two aliens that crash on Earth.

Premise
Two aliens chasing each other crash on Earth and involve humans in their struggle.

Cast
As appearing in screen credits (main roles identified):

 Jason London as Jake Townsend 
 Gigi Edgley as Monica Gray 
 Christa Campbell as Charlie Weise 
 Coby Bell as Jude 
 Jahidi White as Kronnan 
 Mel Fair as Tate 
 Brock Roberts as Major 12 OP 1 
 Lee Horsley as Joe "Diamond Joe" Carson 
 Kip Martin as Alex Townsend 
 Tom Lowell as Ranger #1
 Michelle Anselmo as TV Reporter
 Natalie Matias as Quintana, Jude's Wife
 Olivia Clift as Little Girl On Swing
 Lorraine Clarkson as Female Driver 
 Dan Gartner as Porch Onlooker

References

External links 
 
 
 

2007 science fiction films
Syfy original films
American science fiction television films
2000s English-language films
2000s American films